R.Hide in Plain Site is the fourth and final studio album by American garage house producer Romanthony. It was released by Glasgow Underground Records on April 18, 2000.

Track listing
 "Countdown 2000"
 "Bring U Up"
 "Luv Somebody"
 "Feel Ya Love"
 "Wreck"
 "Down 4 U"
 "Floorpiece"
 "Count Da Ways"
 "Body Language"
 "? $ Luv"
 "Faraway"

External links
 [ allmusic Overview]

2000 albums
Romanthony albums